Arctia dejeani is a species of moth in the family Erebidae first described by Jean Baptiste Godart in 1822. It is found on the Iberian Peninsula.

The wingspan is 41–42 mm.

The larvae feed on Taraxacum and Plantago species.

This species, along with the others of the genus Hyphoraia, was moved to Arctia as a result of phylogenetic research published by Rönkä et al. in 2016.

References

Moths described in 1822
Arctiina